Destiny Slocum (born September 9, 1997) is an American basketball player. She played college basketball for the Arkansas Razorbacks. She played in the WNBA for the Las Vegas Aces and the Atlanta Dream.

She was a 2016 McDonald's High School All-American who played her Freshman year at the University of Maryland and was named WBCA Freshman of the Year. She then transferred to Oregon State and was required to sit out a season per NCAA rules. Following the 2018–2019 season, she was named an honorable mention All-American by the Women's Basketball Coaches Association and Associated Press.

In April 2020, she announced that she was entering the Transfer Portal, planning to leave Oregon State. She has one year left of eligibility. Later that month, Slocum, announced that she was transferring to Arkansas.

Collegiate statistics 

Source

WNBA career statistics

Regular season

|-
| align="left" | 2021
| align="left" | Las Vegas
| 21 || 0 || 6.3 || .318 || .333 || .600 || 0.9 || 0.6 || 0.1 || 0.0 || 0.3 || 1.0
|-
| align="left" | 2022
| align="left" | Atlanta
| 3 || 0 || 13.7 || .364 || .333 || .600 || 1.3 || 1.3 || 0.0 || 0.0 || 1.7 || 4.7
|-
| align="left" | Career
| align="left" | 2 years, 2 teams
| 24 || 0 || 7.3 || .333 || .333 || .600 || 1.0 || 0.7 || 0.1 || 0.0 || 0.5 || 1.5

Postseason

|-
| align="left" | 2021
| align="left" | Las Vegas
| 3 || 0 || 4.3 || .500 || .000 || .000 || 0.0 || 0.0 || 0.0 || 0.0 || 0.0 || 0.7
|-
| align="left" | Career
| align="left" | 1 year, 1 team
| 3 || 0 || 4.3 || .500 || .000 || .000 || 0.0 || 0.0 || 0.0 || 0.0 || 0.0 || 0.7

References

1997 births
Living people
American women's basketball players
Arkansas Razorbacks women's basketball players
Basketball players from Idaho
Forwards (basketball)
Las Vegas Aces draft picks
Las Vegas Aces players
LGBT basketball players
LGBT people from Idaho
Lesbian sportswomen
Maryland Terrapins women's basketball players
McDonald's High School All-Americans
Oregon State Beavers women's basketball players
People from Meridian, Idaho
Sportspeople from Boise, Idaho